The Davis County Courthouse in Bloomfield, Iowa, United States was built in 1877. It was individually listed on the National Register of Historic Places in 1974. Two years later it was listed as a contributing property in the Bloomfield Square historic district. The courthouse is the second building to house court functions and county administration.

History
Repairs were made to the building in 1846 and 1848. By 1851, the building was unusable and space for a courtroom was rented for $100 per year. The county started using a  Methodist church for a courtroom in 1863. By 1869 the county was paying $300 a year in rent, but voters continuously voted down proposals to build a new courthouse. Finally, in 1875, voters authorized the construction of the present courthouse, but it was not to exceed $50,000.

The Second Empire structure was designed by the Fort Wayne, Indiana architectural firm T.J. Tolan & Sons. John Lane supervised construction and Larkworthy and Menke of Quincy, Illinois did the stonework. The Kimberly Bell Works of Troy, New York cast the bell, and the Seth Thomas Clock Company provided the four-faced clock. Both date from 1876. The building itself was completed in 1877. The old courthouse was purchased by D.C. Van Duyn for $50, and he moved it to his farm where it served as his house.

In addition to court functions and county administration, the courthouse has a served as a center for civic functions. Over the years it has hosted such events as band concerts, scrap metal drives during World War II, barbecues, and civic rallies.

Architecture
The Second Empire structure is an example of post-Civil War architecture known as "General Grant Gothic." It is surrounded by a
 landscaped park. The two-story building measures . Its  brick walls are faced with Bedford stone. The building features a mansard roof, a cupola that serves as both a bell and clock tower, roof cresting, bracketed eaves, and Bedford stone-strimmed windows. The central tower is a wood structure that is topped by a statue of the goddess of Justice. It is visible from miles away, and it is the focal point for the community.

References

Government buildings completed in 1877
Second Empire architecture in Iowa
Bloomfield, Iowa
Buildings and structures in Davis County, Iowa
National Register of Historic Places in Davis County, Iowa
Courthouses on the National Register of Historic Places in Iowa
County courthouses in Iowa
Clock towers in Iowa
Individually listed contributing properties to historic districts on the National Register in Iowa
1877 establishments in Iowa